A civil enforcement officer (CEO or colloquially traffic warden, parking enforcement officer, or parking attendant) is a person employed to enforce parking, traffic and other restrictions and laws.

England & Wales
In England, they are employed by county councils, London borough councils, metropolitan district councils or Transport for London, and in Wales by county (borough) councils - or private companies contracted by any of the above. 
Until the passage of the Traffic Management Act 2004, on-street parking and traffic movement violations were enforced by non-warranted police traffic wardens employed by constabularies. Off-street parking violations were enforced by parking attendants employed by local authorities and private companies.

Powers of a Civil Enforcement Officer
Civil enforcement officers may only exercise their functions when wearing a uniform authorised by the Home Secretary. 

Their powers include:

issue penalty charge notices for numerous offences (governed by civil law), either via a hand-held device or CCTV.
inspect and confiscate disabled parking permits
interview motorists suspected of disabled badge fraud under caution
immobilise vehicles.

Penalty charge notices are not criminal proceedings, and failure to pay will result in certificated bailiffs serving warrants of execution. They may issue penalties for several moving violations, among them driving in bus lanes, executing prohibited turns and driving the wrong way on a one way system.  

Civil enforcement officers employed by some authorities issue fixed penalties for non-traffic offences using the community safety accreditation scheme of the Police Reform Act 2002.

In Wales, the Vale of Glamorgan Council employs "dual role" uniformed enforcement officers that are authorised to enforce both civil parking legislation, and criminal legislation with regard to environmental crime, anti-social behaviour, bylaws and public spaces protection orders.

Belgium
In Belgium, municipalities use Stadswachten (City Guards); these public but civil officials can be compared to civil enforcement officers and can only write reports that are sent to a magistrate who decides if, according to the findings of the guards report, a fine will be issued. In Belgium, Stadswachten can be recognized by the purple jackets they wear.

The Netherlands

In the Netherlands municipalities used Stadswachten (City Guards) until 2004; these officers were public civil servants who patrolled the city but had no power to fine civilians. These days Stadswachten do not exist anymore, and the Guard departments were changed into Handhaving (Enforcement) units. Unlike the British City Wardens, Handhavers (Enforcers) do not have civil status but are fully public officials and have limited police powers. These officers are sworn BOA (Special Enforcement Officer) and have the powers to detain people to confirm their identity, search people for proof of identification or offensive or dangerous weapons (if arrested), investigate offences and certain crimes, issue fixed penalties, make warrantless arrests and use force with or without the use of weapons (baton, pepperspray). Most municipal enforcement officers (BOA) are equipped with handcuffs. Some cities also issue police batons to their officers. According to Dutch law, some BOA's can be equipped with pepperspray (cities of Utrecht and Amsterdam in 2016) and a handgun (cities of EDE and Enschede) if the necessity is proven by the city council and mayor. Also, BOA's working for the Dutch Correctional Services (Dienst Vervoer en Ondersteuning) who do transportation and guard duty for the Dutch Prisons are equipped with a baton, pepperspray and a handgun. They also support the Dutch police force whenever and where ever it is needed. Failure to comply with an order given by a BOA can result in arrest.

In 2014 the justice department ordered the creation of a national style uniform for BOAs employed by municipalities. Until that date, every city had its own uniform. The new uniform is based on the national police uniform but with a different color and unique element. The name used in this uniform is HANDHAVING and consist of a navy blue cargo pants, two colored polo shirts (navy and cobalt blue) with a checkered band across the chest. On the chest and on the back is the text "Handhaving" and on the sleeves are BOA patches which consist of a hand holding a scepter in front of a shield. Furthermore, officers wear Spanish-style police caps with a checker band and a metal BOA insignia on the front. Officers are allowed to wear high shoes with trouser legs twisted above them. Some cities issue officer anti stab vests in the same colors as the polo shirts, although a few cities use high-visibility yellow vests. A majority of large cities also use BOA bike patrol, motorcycle units (Amsterdam and Rotterdam), vehicle patrols in marked cars or plain clothes officers.

References

External links

Law enforcement occupations in the United Kingdom